Fencibles United AFC is an amateur association football club, they currently compete in the NRFL Championship. The club is based in Howick/Pakuranga, Auckland.  The clubs roots go back to Pakuranga Town AFC and Howick AFC.

History
In 1995, two East Auckland clubs, Pakuranga Town AFC and Howick AFC, amalgamated to form Fencibles United AFC.

The adoption of 'Fencibles United AFC' as the name for the club, has recognised the Fencibles as the historic link between the two clubs and identifies with the locality.  The Fencibles were the first European settlers in the region.  The name 'Fencibles' refers to the Royal New Zealand Fencible Corps.  'Fencible' is derived from the word 'Defencible', meaning capable of defence.

The club 'playing strip' of red, blue with white trim also reflects the uniforms of the Royal New Zealand Fencibles Corps. In late 2016, Fencibles FC introduced a new kit by Nike. The new homekit consisted of two red stripes, and one blue stripe running down the center. It featured a Nike tick, and the Fencibles FC Crest.

The clubs best run in the Chatham Cup, New Zealand's national knock-out cup competition, was in 2003. They made the made the last sixteen before losing to Central United in the fifth round.

Senior Men
The senior men's team competes in the Lotto Sport Italia NRFL Division 1.

Senior Women

Fencibles United competes in the NRFL Women's Premier League.

Notable players

  Nik Viljoen
  Abby Erceg

References

External links
 Fencibles United (Official website)

Association football clubs established in 1995
Association football clubs in Auckland
1995 establishments in New Zealand